The Federal Reserve Bank of San Francisco Salt Lake City Branch is one of four branches of the Federal Reserve Bank of San Francisco.
The branch is located at 120 South State Street in downtown Salt Lake City, Utah.

The branch currently occupies a six-story building (three stories above and three stories below ground) that was constructed in the late 1950s. When the bank moved into this building in 1959, it was the fourth home to the Salt Lake Branch since its establishment in 1918.

Current Board of Directors
The following people are on the board of directors as of 2013:

Appointed by the Federal Reserve Bank

Appointed by the Board of Governors

See also

 Federal Reserve Act
 Federal Reserve System
 Federal Reserve Bank
 Federal Reserve Districts
 Federal Reserve Branches
 Federal Reserve Bank of San Francisco
 Federal Reserve Bank of San Francisco Los Angeles Branch
 Federal Reserve Bank of San Francisco Portland Branch
 Federal Reserve Bank of San Francisco Seattle Branch
 Federal Reserve Bank of San Francisco Building (San Francisco, California)
 Structure of the Federal Reserve System

References

Federal Reserve branches